Dunrobin/Parti Field Aerodrome  is located  west northwest of Dunrobin, Ontario, Canada.

References

Registered aerodromes in Ontario